Baham (Hom in the local language) is the seat of the Department of Hauts-Plateaux, in the Western Province of Cameroon. It also constitutes a traditional Bamileke chiefdom.

It is situated 250 km (155 mi) from Douala and 20 km (12 mi) from Bafoussam.

Villages
Baham comprises 16 villages:
 Boukue
 Cheffou
 Chengne
 Demgo
 Djemgheu
 Hiala
 Ho'o
 Ka'a
 Kaffo
 La'agweu
 Medjo
 Ngouogoua
 Pi'i
 Pouomze
 Souo
 Wouom

Neighbouring villages are: Bandjoun, Bayangam, Bahouan, Bamendjou, Batie, Badenkop, Bangou, and others.

Language
The language spoken is Baham or Hom, a variant of ghomala', and belongs to the family of Bamiléké languages.

See also
Communes of Cameroon

References
 Site de la primature - Élections municipales 2002

External links
 Portail Royaume Baham (French)
 Baham Museum 
 Contrôle de gestion et performance des services publics communaux des villes camerounaises - Thèse de Donation Avele, Université Montesquieu Bordeaux IV 
 Charles Nanga, La réforme de l’administration territoriale au Cameroun à la lumière de la loi constitutionnelle n° 96/06 du 18 janvier 1996, Mémoire ENA. 

Populated places in West Region (Cameroon)
Communes of Cameroon